Parliamentary elections were held in the United Arab Emirates on 3 October 2015 to elect the half of the members of the Federal National Council. The elections took place through an electoral college, which was expanded from 129,274 members in the 2011 elections to 224,279 for the 2015 elections.

Electoral system
At the time of the elections, the 40-member Federal National Council had 20 indirectly-elected members and 20 appointed members. The 20 elected members were elected by seven electoral colleges; the colleges of Abu Dhabi and Dubai elected four members, the colleges of Sharjah and Ras al-Khaimah elected three, and the colleges of Ajman, Fujairah and Umm al-Quwain elected two. Only around a third of Emirati citizens (who themselves are around 12% of the country's population) were members of the electoral colleges.

Following changes to the electoral system, the elections were held using single non-transferable vote, meaning voters could only vote for one candidate in their emirate, irrespective of the number of seats. Overseas voting was allowed for the first time.

On election day, 36 voting centers were opened nationwide, nine of which had opened for early voting on 28–30 September. Overseas voters were able to cast their vote for the first time in 94 voting centers in UAE embassies on 20–21 September. Overall 79,157 voters cast their vote, making a turnout of 35.29%.

Campaign
A total of 330 candidates contested the elections, of which 252 were men and 78 women. Campaigning was allowed between 6 and 30 September.

Results
Of the twenty elected members, 19 were men and only one woman, Naama Al Sharhan, who was elected in Ras al-Khaimah. Voter turnout was 35%, up from 26% in the 2011 elections, and ranged from 70% in Umm al-Quwain to 22.1% in Dubai.

Elected members

References

Elections in the United Arab Emirates
United Arab Emirates
Parliamentary
United Arab Emirates
Election and referendum articles with incomplete results